The Chattanooga Choo-Choo Hotel (formerly known as Terminal Station) in Chattanooga, Tennessee, is a former railroad station once owned and operated by the Southern Railway. Listed on the National Register of Historic Places, the station is currently operated as a hotel, and is a member of Historic Hotels of America, part of the National Trust for Historic Preservation.

History

The original Chattanooga Union Station was built in 1858 (demolished in 1973). Plans for a new station originally called for a smaller facility to handle supplies and small packages. Instead, it was decided to build a grand station to handle passengers as well.  Construction on this Terminal Station began in 1906; it was opened in 1909 at the total cost of $1.5 million. 

The Terminal Station was the first train station in the South to help open a pathway to connect the north from the south, connecting the city of Cincinnati to Chattanooga.  Eventually, the Terminal Station was serving some fifty passenger trains per day plus some freight and package service. 

It has greeted United States presidents Woodrow Wilson, Franklin D. Roosevelt, and Theodore Roosevelt.

Decline

Chattanooga was no exception to the general decline in American railroad passenger traffic after World War II. In 1949, the Southern canceled its Florida Sunbeam, an express train that connected Chattanooga to Detroit, Cincinnati, and Jacksonville, Florida.  

Traffic continued to decline amid competition from automobiles and airplanes in the 1950s and 1960s. One by one, the Southern cancelled its trains, which included the Pelican, connecting New York and New Orleans; Ponce de Leon, Cincinnati-Jacksonville; Royal Palm, Cincinnati-Miami; and Tennessean, Memphis-Washington, D.C. As passenger traffic declined, the railroad began using the station's platforms for storage. 

In 1970, Southern cancelled its last passenger train to Chattanooga—the Birmingham Special, from New York City to Birmingham—and closed Terminal Station.

Restoration

In April 1973, after nearly being demolished, Terminal Station was reopened by a group of business people seeking to trade on the "Chattanooga Choo Choo" song and its enduring popularity. They renamed Terminal Station  "Chattanooga Choo Choo Hilton and Entertainment Complex". Investors poured more than $4 million into the renovation project. In 1989, another group of business people invested another $4 million to refurbish and renovate the hotel and to bring in and hire new management and staff. They renamed it The Chattanooga Choo Choo Hotel.

The  complex was a convention center, hotel and resort with restaurants and shops. Hotel guests could stay in restored passenger railway cars.  In 2017, the two back buildings of the hotel were renovate, turned into small apartments, and renamed Passenger Flats.

The train tracks have mostly been removed to accommodate the growth of the city. The modern Chattanooga Choo Choo Hotel is adorned with a bright neon miniature sign version of the trains that once visited. The hotel is surrounded and fenced in by rose gardens and includes an additional area for educational historic trolley rides as well as an outdoor ice skating rink during the cold winter months. There are several restaurants, a comedy club and the Gate 11 micro-distillery at Terminal Station, including a restaurant co-owned by actor Norman Reedus. It also once featured the "Dinner in the Diner" dining car restaurant, which is no longer operating. Some parts of the complex were connected by a heritage streetcar line, operated by a 1924-built ex-New Orleans Perley Thomas trolley car; this has been discontinued.

In 2022, the complex's owners launched a second renovation, which started with the demolition of one of the passenger cars and the removal of others. Officials said that "eight historic train cars will be relocated adjacent to the hotel and nine will be relocated among the Gardens", while six will be donated to the Tennessee Valley Railroad Museum. The renovation was slated for completion in mid-2023, when the hotel is to reopen with "127 rooms, including 25 Pullman train car rooms".

Architecture and pop culture

The Beaux-Arts-style station designed by Donn Barber remains one of the grandest buildings in Chattanooga, with an arched main entrance leading to a center section with an  ceiling dome with a skylight. 

The station included a main waiting room, bathrooms, ticket offices, and other services for passengers. The original Terminal Station was merely one story in height, so the aforementioned dome and skylight made this area look gargantuan in juxtaposition to other similar buildings, while the arched main entrance was said to be the "largest arch in the world." Lighting was provided by large brass chandeliers. Terminal Station had 14 train tracks serving seven passenger platforms. The then-president of the Southern Railway System, William Finley, wanted the architecture to recall  the National Park Bank of New York.

The 1941 Glenn Miller song "Chattanooga Choo Choo" told the story of a train trip from Track 29 at Pennsylvania Station in New York City through Baltimore, North and South Carolina, and finishing the trip at Terminal Station. (No such train actually operated.)

See also 
 Union Station (Chattanooga)

References

External links

 Chattanooga Choo Choo Hotel

Beaux-Arts architecture in Tennessee
Railway stations closed in 1970
Buildings and structures in Chattanooga, Tennessee
Former railway stations in Tennessee
Railway stations on the National Register of Historic Places in Tennessee
Stations along Southern Railway lines in the United States
Transportation in Chattanooga, Tennessee
Tourist attractions in Chattanooga, Tennessee
Railway stations in the United States opened in 1909
National Register of Historic Places in Chattanooga, Tennessee